Campbell Township is the only township in Emmons County, North Dakota, United States. Its population as of the 2000 Census was 66. It lies in the northeastern corner of the county and borders the following other former townships within Emmons County:
Tell Township (defunct) — south
Lincoln Township (defunct) — southwest corner

References

External links
 U.S. Census map of Campbell Township as of the 2000 Census

Townships in Emmons County, North Dakota
Townships in North Dakota